Blue Labyrinth is a thriller novel by Douglas Preston and Lincoln Child. The book was released on November 11, 2014, by Grand Central Publishing. This is the fourteenth book in the Special Agent Pendergast series.

Plot

—Review by Kirkus Reviews

Reception

References

External links
Official website

American thriller novels
Novels by Douglas Preston
Novels by Lincoln Child
Collaborative novels
Sequel novels
2014 American novels
Grand Central Publishing books